Okonkwo is a name that may refer to:

People
Albert Okonkwo, Nigerian general
Amy Okonkwo (born 1996), Nigerian basketball player
Annie Okonkwo (born 1960), Nigerian politician
Arthur Okonkwo (born 2001) English football player
Charles Okonkwo (born 1965), Nigerian footballer
Chibuzor Okonkwo (born 1988), Nigerian footballer
Chigoziem Okonkwo (born 1999), American football player
Chiké Okonkwo (born 1982), British actor
Christian Okonkwo, Nigerian footballer
Christopher Okonkwo (born 1941), Nigerian athlete
Daniel Okonkwo (born 1975), English basketball player
Digger Okonkwo (born 1975), Nigerian-Maltese footballer
Joe Okonkwo, American writer
Kennedy Okonkwo (born 1977), Nigerian businessman
Kenneth Okonkwo (born 1968), Nigerian actor
Nnamdi Okonkwo, Nigerian banker
Og Okonkwo, Nigerian fashion designer
Onyekachi Okonkwo (born 1982), Nigerian footballer
Patrick Okonkwo (born 1998), Nigerian-American soccer player
Rachael Okonkwo (born 1987), Nigerian actress
Salma Okonkwo (born 1970), Ghanaian entrepreneur

Other
The protagonist of Things Fall Apart, a novel by Chinua Achebe